Katleho Moleko (born 24 August 1986) is a Mosotho football striker.

Club career
Moleko most recently played at the club level for Likhopo Maseru.

International career
Since 2007, he has won four caps for the Lesotho national football team.

External links

1986 births
Living people
People from Maseru
Association football forwards
Lesotho footballers
Lesotho international footballers
Orlando Pirates F.C. players
Lesotho expatriate footballers
Expatriate soccer players in South Africa
Lesotho expatriate sportspeople in South Africa